Hannah Elsy (born 28 December 1986) is a former British rower.

Elsy was educated at Kingston Grammar School and Durham University.

References

1986 births
Living people
English female rowers
European Rowing Championships medalists
People educated at Kingston Grammar School
Durham University Boat Club rowers
Alumni of Durham University